The lesser devil ray (Mobula hypostoma) is a ray in the family Mobulidae. They occur along the coasts of the western Atlantic, from North Carolina to northern Argentina.

Habitat
These rays live in shallow waters and can be found singly or in large shoals.

Diet
They feed on mostly crustaceans, but will sometimes feed on shoals of smaller fish.

Description
They have smaller cephalic fins than their larger manta cousins, and have longer spineless tails.

References

External links
 

lesser devil ray
Fish of the Western Atlantic
Fish of the Dominican Republic
Vulnerable fish
lesser devil ray